The Myer Centre is a five level shopping centre in the heart of the Adelaide city centre situated along the Rundle Mall shopping precinct and North Terrace. It is owned by  Starhill Global REIT and managed by CBRE.

The Myer Centre is the largest shopping centre in the Adelaide city centre and houses the largest Myer store in South Australia, along with over 80 smaller shops. The level below street level includes a large food court.

The Rundle Mall side of the building has an 8-level atrium, with the escalators at the sides. In the 1990s, the upper level housed an indoor amusement park named Dazzeland that included Australia's only indoor rollercoaster.

Terrace Towers
The North Terrace facade of the Myer Centre includes two heritage buildings — Shell House (constructed 1931) and Goldsbrough House (constructed 1935). Above these and the Myer retail outlet is a 6-storey office tower named Terrace Towers.

References

External links

 

Shopping centres in Adelaide
Shopping malls established in 1991